Fulvivirga lutimaris is a Gram-negative and rod-shaped bacterium from the genus of Fulvivirga which has been isolated from tidal flat sediments from the Yellow Sea in Korea.

References

External links
Type strain of Fulvivirga lutimaris at BacDive -  the Bacterial Diversity Metadatabase

Cytophagia
Bacteria described in 2016